Voca may refer to:

Voca Limited, a former provider of payment services for banks and corporates, that merged with LINK to form VocaLink
Voice Output Communication Aid, a device to speak for someone who cannot speak
 Victims of Crime Act of 1984
 Amendments to the Victims of Crime Act under the USA PATRIOT Act, Title VI

Places 
Donja Voća, village and municipality in Varaždin County in Croatia
Gornja Voća, village in Varaždin County in Croatia
Voca, Texas, United States